The Lord Loves the Irish is a 1919 American silent comedy film directed by Ernest C. Warde and starring J. Warren Kerrigan, Aggie Herring and James O. Barrows.

Cast
 J. Warren Kerrigan as Miles Machree
 Aggie Herring as Mother Machree
 James O. Barrows as Timothy Lynch
 Fritzi Brunette as Sheila Lynch
 William Ellingford as Malachi Nolan
 Wedgwood Nowell as Allyn Dexter
 Joseph J. Dowling as Dr. Leon Wilson / Hugo Strauss

References

Bibliography
 Leonhard Gmür. Rex Ingram: Hollywood's Rebel of the Silver Screen. 2013.

External links
 

1919 films
1919 comedy films
1910s English-language films
American silent feature films
Silent American comedy films
American black-and-white films
Films directed by Ernest C. Warde
Films distributed by W. W. Hodkinson Corporation
1910s American films